
The following is a list of notable deaths in April 1912.

Entries for each day are listed alphabetically by surname. A typical entry lists information in the following sequence:
 Name, age, country of citizenship at birth, subsequent country of citizenship (if applicable), reason for notability, cause of death (if known), and reference.

April 1912

1
Paul Brousse, 68, French socialist politician.
George Fleming, 49, Scottish football player.

2
Hedda Anderson, 79, Swedish writer and teacher.
William Sullivan Barnes, 70, Canadian-American minister.
Sir Alfred Dryden, 5th and 8th Baronet, 90, English cricket player and barrister.
James Morris, 79, Australian politician.
Ishimoto Shinroku, 58, Imperial Japanese Army general and Minister of War, tuberculosis.
Edward O'Connor Terry, 68, English actor.

3
Philip Argall, 57, Australian Test cricket umpire.
Charles H. Prince, 74, American politician.
A. V. Ragsdale, 58, American politician.
Calbraith Perry Rodgers, 33, American aviation pioneer, plane crash.

4
Charles Brantley Aycock, 52, American politician and 50th Governor of North Carolina, heart attack.
Isaac K. Funk, 72, American minister, lexicographer, and publisher.
Meredith Howland, 79, American soldier and clubman.
David Packham, 79, Australian politician.
Robinson Souttar, 63, British Liberal Party politician.
Carl G. von Iwonski, 81, American painter.

5
Robert Dudley Adams, 82, Australian businessman, journalist, and author.
Mikhail Mikhailovich Berezovsky, 64, Russian ornithologist and ethnologist.
David Patrick Fisher, 62, New Zealand printer, trade unionist and public servant.
James Jordan, 69, American judge.
William Robertson, 48, New Zealand cricket player.
André Fernand Thesmar, 69, French enameler.

6
Chitto Harjo, 65/66, Native American leader.
Richard Frommel, 57, German obstetrician and gynaecologist.
Giovanni Pascoli, 56, Italian poet, writer, and classical scholar, liver cancer.
Eleazar Roberts, 87, Welsh musician, writer and amateur astronomer.

7
Abbott Lawrence Rotch, 51, American meteorologist, appendicitis.

8
James A. Bushnell, 85, American businessman and banker.
Emma Coradi-Stahl, 65, Swiss feminist.
Edward Divers, 74, British chemist.
Andrew Saks, 64, American businessman.
Emily Soldene, 73, English singer, actress, theatre manager, novelist and columnist.

9
Gottfried Strasser, 57, Swiss pastor, poet and writer.

10
Christian Møinichen Havig, 87, Norwegian politician.
Gabriel Monod, 68, French historian.

11
John Rowland Dacey, 57, Irish-Australian politician, nephritis.
James Montgomery Rice, 70, American soldier, lawyer, and public servant.
Grand Duchess Vera Konstantinovna of Russia, 58, Russian noblewoman.
Francis Charles Woods, 68, Scottish-American architect and organ-builder.

12
Clara Barton, 90, American nurse and founder of the American Red Cross.
Ernest Duchesne, 37, French physician, tuberculosis.
Frederick Dent Grant, 61, American diplomat and son of U.S. President Ulysses S. Grant, heart failure.
Albert Pieczonka, 84, German-American classical composer and pianist, pneumonia.

13
Takuboku Ishikawa, 26, Japanese poet, tuberculosis.
Robbins Little, 80, American lawyer and librarian.

14
Henri Brisson, 76, Prime Minister of France.
Horatio B. Knox, 55, American academic.
Alonzo Clifton McClennan, 56, American physician.
Alfred Pribram, 70, Bohemian internist.
Rudolph Schwarz, 45, Austrian-American sculptor.

15
Charles Gordon Ames, 83, American clergyman and lecturer.
Harriet Fisher Mole, 70, British socialist, feminist, and trade union organiser.
Jerome of Sandy Cove, Unidentified male amputee discovered on the beach of Sandy Cove, Canada.
Felipe Salvador, 41, Filipino revolutionary, execution by hanging.
Notable victims of the sinking of the RMS Titanic:
Thomas Andrews, 39, British businessman and shipbuilder, drowned.
John Jacob Astor IV, 47, American businessman, real estate developer, and writer.
Joseph Bell, 51, British sailor and chief engineer in the engine room of RMS Titanic.
David John Bowen, 20, Welsh boxer.
Archibald Butt, 46, American journalist and American Army officer.
Thomas Byles, 42, English catholic priest.
Roderick Chisholm, 43, Scottish shipbuilder and co-designer the RMS Titanic.
William Denton Cox, 29, British steward aboard RMS Titanic.
Walter Donald Douglas, 50, American business executive.
Annie Funk, 38, American missionary.
Jacques Futrelle, 37, American journalist and writer.
Luigi Gatti, 37, Italian businessman and restaurateur.
Sidney Leslie Goodwin, 1, British toddler known until 2007 as "The Unknown Child".
Benjamin Guggenheim, 46, American businessman.
John Harper, 39, Scottish baptist pastor.
Henry B. Harris, 45, American Broadway producer and theatre owner.
Wallace Hartley, 33, English violinist and bandleader on the RMS Titanic.
Charles Melville Hays, 55, American railroad executive.
Ann Elizabeth Isham, 50, American socialite.
Edward Austin Kent, 58, American architect.
Joseph Philippe Lemercier Laroche, 25, Haitian engineer.
René-Jacques Lévy, 37, French chemist.
Francis Davis Millet, 63, American painter, sculptor and writer.
William Mintram, 46, English fireman (stoker) on the RMS Titanic.
Harry Markland Molson, 55, Canadian politician and entrepreneur.
James Paul Moody, 24, British naval officer on the RMS Titanic.
Clarence Moore, 47, American sportsman and businessman.
William McMaster Murdoch, 39, Scottish sailor and First Officer on the RMS Titanic.
Eino Viljami Panula, 1, Finnish toddler.
Jack Phillips, 25, British sailor and senior wireless operator on the RMS Titanic.
Manuel Uruchurtu Ramírez, 39, Mexican lawyer and politician.
Edward Smith, 62, British naval officer on the RMS Titanic, drowned.
W. T. Stead, 62, British newspaper editor and investigative journalism pioneer.
Ida Straus, 63, American homemaker and wife of Isidor Straus.
Isidor Straus, 67, German-American businessman and politician.
John Thayer, 49, American businessman.
Frank M. Warren, Sr., 63, American businessman.
George Dennick Wick, 58, American industrialist.
George Dunton Widener, 50, American businessman.
Harry Elkins Widener, 27, American businessman, and a son of George Dunton Widener.
Henry Tingle Wilde, 39, British sailor and Chief Officer on the RMS Titanic.
Duane Williams, 51, American lawyer.
John Wesley Woodward, 32, English musician on the RMS Titanic.
George Henry Wright, 62, Canadian businessman and philanthropist.

16
James Peterkin Alexander, 76, Scottish-Canadian farmer and politician.
Henry Bethune, 67, English cricket player.
Knut Ekwall, 69, Swedish painter and illustrator.
Edward Gabbett, 71, Ireland Anglican priest.
Wilhelmine Heise, 74, Danish philanthropist.
Orlando J. Hodge, 83, American lawyer and politician.
Thomas G. Lawson, 76, American politician.
Henry F. Thomas, 68, American physician and politician.

17
William F. Harrity, 61, American lawyer and politician.
August T. Koerner, 68, American businessman and politician.
Don Giuseppe Rizzo, 48, Italian Catholic priest, politician and journalist.
Ace Stewart, 43, American Major League Baseball player.

18
Damer Leslie Allen, 34, Irish-British aviator, aviation accident.
Hank Gehring, 31, American Major League Baseball player.
William G. Hills, 70, American Army soldier during the American Civil War and recipient of the Medal of Honor.
George Franklin Huff, 69, American politician.
Martha Ripley, 68, American physician, suffragist, and professor of medicine.
James D. Robinson, 71, Canadian political figure.
Frederick Seddon, 40, British murderer, execution by hanging.
Walter Clopton Wingfield, 78, British Army officer and inventor.

19
Patricio Escobar, 69, President of Paraguay.
Josua Lindahl, 68, Swedish American geologist and paleontologist.
William McAleer, 74, American politician.

20
Sam Barkley, 53, American Major League Baseball player.
John N. Eckes, 67, American Union Army soldier during the American Civil War and recipient of the Medal of Honor.
Marian Farquharson, 65, British naturalist and women's rights activist.
Jacob Elias Friend, 54, American lawyer, businessman, and politician.
Daniel Gault, 69, American newspaperman, educator and politician.
Djóni í Geil, 62, Faroese craftsman, editor, and politician.
Charles Harper, 69, Australia pastoralist, newspaper proprietor and politician.
Harry Pears, 34, Australian rules football player.
Pedro Lira Rencoret, 66, Chilean painter and art critic.
Bram Stoker, 64, Irish author known for his 1897 horror novel Dracula, stroke.

21
F. Benedict Herzog, 52, American electrical engineer, artist and photographer.
Willoughby Wallace Hooper, 75, English military officer and photographer.
Alexander McKay, 69, Canadian politician.
Siri von Essen, 61, Finnish noblewoman and actress.
Yung Wing, 83, Chinese-American diplomat and businessman, apoplectic shock.

22
Heinrich Unverricht, 58, German internist.

23
Alphonse Trémeau de Rochebrune, 75, French botanist, malacologist, and zoologist.

24
Samuel Bourne, 77, British photographer, heart attack.
Eiler Rasmussen Eilersen, 85, Danish landscape painter.
Michael Flürscheim, 68, German economist and Georgist.
Justin McCarthy, 81, Irish nationalist, historian, novelist and politician.
Johan Frederik Thaulow, 71, Norwegian Army officer and physician.

25
George William Knox, 59, American theologian and writer, pneumonia.
Waclaw Rolicz-Lieder, 45, Polish poet and translator.
Martin Schubert, 73, American Army officer during the American Civil War and recipient of the Medal of Honor.

26
Toshio Aoki, 58, Japanese-American artist and painter.
Guillermo Bauer, 68, German-Argentine businessman.
Eugene L. Demers, 69, American politician.
Charles Perkins, 57, English cricket player.
Hermann Zabel, 79, German botanist.

27
Alfred John Church, 83, English classical scholar.
Daniel Kimball Pearsons, 92, American physician and philanthropist.

28
Jules Bonnot, 35, French bank robber, shot.
Robert Dollard, 70, American attorney and politician.
Robert A. Kerr, 71, American politician and friend of industrialist Andrew Carnegie
Stefan Izbinsky, 27, Ukrainian chess master.
Yuri Kimimasa, 82, Japanese businessman and politician.
Michael Thomas Stenson, 73, Canadian politician.
Otto Stichling, 46, German Art Nouveau sculptor.

29
Henri Bouckaert, 41, French rower and Olympic champion.
Subh-i-Azal, 81, Iranian religious leader.

30
František Kmoch, 63, Czech composer and conductor.
Francis Reed, 61, English cricket player
Henry Sweet, 66, English philologist, phonetician and grammarian, pernicious anemia.
John Taylor, 78, British architect.

See also
 Lists of deaths by year
 April 1912

References 

1912-04
 04